The Sylvest House on the Washington Parish Fairgrounds in Franklinton, Louisiana is a house that was built in c.1880.  It was listed on the National Register of Historic Places in 1979.

It is a dog trot house which was built by Nehemiah Sylvest.

It was located in or near Fisher, Louisiana and was moved to a rural-like area in the Washington Parish Fairgrounds to be preserved.

References

Houses on the National Register of Historic Places in Louisiana
Washington Parish, Louisiana
Houses completed in 1880